Fishponds is a large suburb in the north-east of the English city of Bristol, about  from the city centre. It has two large Victorian-era parks: Eastville Park and Vassall's Park (once the Vassall Family estate, also known as Oldbury Court). The River Frome runs through both with the Frome Valley Walkway alongside it. A restored mill found at Snuff Mills near the Vassall's Park end of the river has kept its original waterwheel, which can still be seen and heard turning. Eastville Park has a large boating lake with central wildlife reserves. Fishponds is mainly residential. Two main bus routes pass through. Housing is typically terraced Victorian. The high street shops include an international supermarket, Asian food store, charity shops, takeaways and Lidl, Aldi and Morrisons supermarkets. It has a small student population from the presence of the Glenside campus of the University of the West of England. The name Fishponds derives from when it was a quarry district, like nearby Soundwell. The empty quarries became large fishponds, which have since been filled in. One remained until the mid-1970s, when it was officially closed: a popular swimming area named "The Lido" by locals. It now belongs to an angling club.

Facilities

Public houses/pubs in Fishponds
There are 16 pubs in Fishponds, most of them dating from the Victorian era. Two are modern conversions; the Old Post Office, and the VanDyke, built as a 1200-seat cinema in 1926 but closed in 1973. The Star (built in 1853), was once the headquarters of Bristol Rovers football club when they played as the Black Arabs in the 1890s.

Others include the Farriers Arms, now closed and boarded up (built 1872), Railway Tavern (built 1867), Fishponds Tavern, converted into two houses (built 1904), Full Moon, now the New Moon (built 1850), Golden Lion (built 1883), Cross Keys now closed (built 1853), Cross Hands (built 1853), Old Tavern now closed (built 1899), Greyhound (built 1883), Spotted Cow (built 1883), Portcullis (built 1853), Warwick Arms (built 1906), and Oldbury Court (built 1957). Most are along the Fishponds Road running from Downend and Staple Hill in the north down towards Eastville in the south.

Transport

Buses
Fishponds is mainly served by First West of England buses 48/48A/49, 17, Y2 & Y5, with 5 and 6 & 7 serving the outskirts.

Trains and trams
Fishponds railway station opened in 1866 and closed in 1965. It included a shunting line for Fishponds-built locomotives of the Avonside Locomotive Works to join the main line. The Bristol & Bath Railway Path now runs down the old line, and can be accessed at several points in Fishponds. The Bristol Tramway operated from Old Market to Fishponds tram terminus from 1897 to 1941. The suburb, like most of eastern Bristol, is currently not served by rail. The two nearest stations are Stapleton Road and Filton Abbey Wood. The reopening of the Henbury loop line will include reopening 
two railway stations in north Bristol: Henbury and North Filton. The latter will be a short distance west of Fishponds.

Local government
Fishponds is within the city, county and unitary authority of Bristol. Most of it belongs to the Frome Vale council ward, the southern part to the Hillfields ward and the western part to the Eastville ward.

Demography
The outskirts of Fishponds to the south comprise Chester Park and Mayfield Park. Fishponds is bordered by five suburbs: Downend, Staple Hill, St. George, Eastville and Stapleton. At the 2011 census the Greater Fishponds area had a population of 37,575.

History

The area of Fishponds was once covered by the Royal Forest of Kingswood. The forest was progressively reduced and developed over the centuries, with Fishponds first recorded as the "Newe Pooles" in 1610, and subsequently "Fish Ponds" by 1734. By the 17th century it was a thriving village with numerous stone-built cottages for miners and quarrymen for coal and pennant stone. The village grew up around the two pools formed from the old quarries, but both were filled in by 1839. However, there is still a fishpond called The Lido in Alcove Road.

During the mid-to-late 19th century, Fishponds established a large manufacturing industry along Lodge Causeway and Filwood Road.

Engineering and railway
Fishponds has been the site of several metal foundries, including George Adlam & Sons founded in the 1830s and Parnall & Sons, a foundry and scale works to manufacture of weights, measures and shop fittings. The company would later fit out ocean liner passenger compartments on the RMS Britannic in 1929 and the famous QE2 in the 1960s.

The railway was built through Fishponds in 1835 and later included a shunting line for locomotives of the Avonside Locomotive Works to join the main line. Peckett and Sons also built locomotives at the Atlas Works towards Speedwell, whose engines joined the line at Clay Hill, until the firm closed in 1961.

Chocolates and confectionery
From 1894 Palmer Bros biscuit and cake manufacturers had two sites in Fishponds Road, including a factory that is now part of the City Glass Company. Webers chocolates in Goodneston Road opened in 1914 and produced chocolates for 50 years, having had production lines alongside Oerlikon 20mm cannons in World War II.

Automobile and aircraft manufacturing
Straker-Squire opened a large factory on Lodge Causeway in 1906, and was a major producer of early London Buses, with the factory in Fishponds supplying 70 per cent of them by 1909. The firm moved to London in 1919.

The aeronautics industry arrived in Fishponds in 1914 when Brazil Straker on Lodge Causeway began building Rolls-Royce aircraft engines for the RFC in World War I. Cosmos Engineering bought the firm and Roy Fedden designed the Cosmos Mercury engine before the company was forced into bankruptcy and then taken over by the Bristol Aeroplane Company in 1920. The site was later acquired by Parnall & Sons, which from 1941 produced aircraft components for a range of RAF aircraft, including wings for De Havilland Tiger Moths and fuselages for Short Stirling bombers.

Post-war, Parnall & Sons continued manufacturing aircraft interiors and fuselages until about 1960. Today, Diamonite Aircraft Furnishings on Goodneston Road supplies some of the world's best aircraft interiors, including one for the Russian President Vladimir Putin.

Pottery, paper and printing
Pountney & Co moved to Fishponds in 1905 and opened a large factory on Lodge Causeway. It had an entirely new labour-saving design and produced a range of domestic and luxury ceramics that were exported across the world. The Royal Cauldron name was acquired in 1962, but by then the factory was suffering from lack of investment and it became insolvent in 1971. The factory was later pulled down; the site is now occupied by the Lodge Causeway Trading Estate.

E. S. & A. Robinson opened a large cardboard-box factory at Filwood Road in 1922. A subsidiary, Robinson's Waxed Paper Co. Ltd, built a new factory across the road in 1929. In World War II the company produced aircraft components for the Bristol Aeroplane Company. Robinson's merged to become the Dickinson Robinson Group in 1966 and finally closed, after further takeovers and mergers, in 1996. The two sites are now owned by Graphic Packaging and Zanetti & Company Ltd stone and marble masons, whose products and floors appear in airports, shops and railway stations throughout the UK.

References

Bartlett, John Images of England, Fishponds Tempus 2004

External links

Fishponds Local History Society
Rotary Club of Fishponds & Downend
Bristol & Bath Railway Path

Areas of Bristol